Holocheilus is a genus of flowering plants in the family Asteraceae.

 Species
 Holocheilus brasiliensis (L.) Cabrera - Brazil, Argentina, Paraguay, Uruguay
 Holocheilus fabrisii Cabrera - Bolivia, southern Brazil, northwestern Argentina
 Holocheilus hieracioides (D.Don) Cabrera - Brazil, Argentina, Paraguay, Uruguay
 Holocheilus illustris (Vell.) Cabrera - Brazil, Argentina, Uruguay
 Holocheilus monocephalus Mondin - Rio Grande do Sul, Santa Catarina
 Holocheilus pinnatifidus (Less.) Cabrera - Paraná, São Paulo
 Holocheilus schulzii (Cabrera) Cabrera - Paraná, Argentina, Paraguay

References

Asteraceae genera
Nassauvieae
Flora of South America